The Caudron C.109 was a light utility aircraft built in France in the late 1920s.

Design and development
The C.109 was a parasol-winged braced monoplane of conventional configuration with fixed tailskid undercarriage.  The pilot and single passenger sat in tandem open cockpits.  C.109s were used in a number of record attempts of the day, and were used to set distance records in the under 350 kg class of 868 km on 19 May 1927 (piloted by Juste Thoret), and 1,581 km on 27 October 1927 (piloted by Max Knipping), a women's duration record of 26 hours 47 minutes on 27 July 1929 (piloted by Maryse Bastié), and the first crossing of Mediterranee by a woman, Léna Bernstein (19 August 1929), 2,268 km.

Survivors
At least one aircraft survived to fly postwar, F-PFLN, F-AIQI prewar, being airworthy at Mitry-Mory airfield near Paris in 1957. This aircraft is held in the collection of the Musée de l'Air et de l'Espace at Le Bourget but is not currently on public display.

Variants
C.109
Two-seat light utility aircraft.
C.109.2
One surviving C.109 was fitted with an  Salmson 5Aq radial engine.
C.110
Only two aircraft were built. Fitted with a  Salmson 5AC radial engine.
C.113A development of the C.110, powered by a  Anzani 6A-3 engine.
C.114
Fitted with an Anzani 6-cylinder radial engine.
C.117
Fitted with a  Salmson 5Ac radial engine.

Operators

French Air Force

Specifications (C.109)

References

Bibliography

Further reading

 
 

C.109
1920s French civil utility aircraft
Single-engined tractor aircraft
Parasol-wing aircraft
Aircraft first flown in 1925